Mem Castle (Mems slott) is located at Tåby parish, Norrköping Municipality in Östergötland County  Sweden.  It is situated near the mouth of the Göta Canal.

History
Mem  dates back to 14th century. In  1572, Mem received manor status. The estate has been owned by many Swedish counts, barons and noble families. Mem was an important centre for Duke Karl, later King  Charles IX of Sweden and his armed forces during the war against King Sigismund III Vasa late in the 16th century.

Two stone wing buildings with high manor roofs were built in 1730s. In the late 1790s, the main building was built around the medieval stone fortress. Another floor was built on the main building and the older building style was replaced with stepping stone gables in  Gustavian style architecture.

See also
List of castles in Sweden

References

Castles in Östergötland County